Bosmania membranacea is a species of fern in the family Polypodiaceae, subfamily Microsoroideae. It is native to tropical and subtropical Asia, from India to Japan and south to Sulawesi.

Taxonomy
Bosmania membranacea was first described by David Don in 1825 as Polypodium membranaceum. It has been known by many synonyms, including Microsorum membranaceum. It was transferred from Microsorum to the new genus Bosmania by Weston L. Testo in 2019 as a result of a molecular phylogenetic study.

References

Polypodiaceae
Flora of China
Flora of Eastern Asia
Flora of Indo-China
Flora of Malesia
Flora of the Indian subcontinent